Quebec City ( or), officially Québec, is the capital city of the Canadian province of Quebec. As of July 2021, the city had a population of 549,459, and the metropolitan area had a population of 839,311. It is the eleventh-largest city and the seventh-largest metropolitan area in Canada. It is also the second-largest city in the province after Montreal. It has a humid continental climate with warm summers coupled with cold and snowy winters.

Explorer Samuel de Champlain founded a French settlement here in 1608, and adopted the Algonquin name. Quebec City is one of the oldest European settlements in North America. The ramparts surrounding Old Quebec are the only fortified city walls remaining in the Americas north of Mexico. This area was declared a World Heritage Site by UNESCO in 1985 as the "Historic District of Old Québec".

The city's landmarks include the Château Frontenac hotel that dominates the skyline and the Citadelle of Quebec, an intact fortress that forms the centrepiece of the ramparts surrounding the old city and includes a secondary royal residence. The National Assembly of Quebec (provincial legislature), the Musée national des beaux-arts du Québec (National Museum of Fine Arts of Quebec), and the Musée de la civilisation (Museum of Civilization) are found within or near Vieux-Québec.

Name and usage

Common English-language usage distinguishes the city from the province by referring to the former as Quebec City.

According to the Government of Canada, the Government of Quebec, and the Geographical Names Board of Canada, the names of Canadian cities and towns have only one official form. Thus, Québec is officially spelled with an accented é in both Canadian English and French. However, province names can have different forms in English and French. As a result, in English, the federal government style distinguishes the city and province by spelling the city with an acute accent (Québec) and the province without one (Quebec). The government of Quebec spells both names "Québec", including when writing in English.

In French, the two are distinguished in that most province names including Quebec take definite articles, while most city names do not. As a result, the city is Québec and the province is le Québec; "in Quebec City" is à Québec and "in the province of Quebec" is au Québec; and so forth.

The Algonquian people had originally named the area , an Algonquin word meaning "where the river narrows", because the Saint Lawrence River narrows proximate to the promontory of Quebec and its Cape Diamant.

History

French Regime (1500s–1763) 
Quebec City is one of the oldest European settlements in North America and the only fortified city north of Mexico whose walls still exist. While many of the major cities in Latin America date from the 16th century, among cities in Canada and the U.S., few were created earlier than Quebec City (St. John's, Harbour Grace, Port Royal, St. Augustine, Santa Fe, Jamestown, and Tadoussac).

It is home to the earliest known French settlement in North America, Fort Charlesbourg-Royal, established in 1541 by explorer Jacques Cartier with some 400 persons but abandoned less than a year later due to the hostility of the natives and the harsh winter. The fort was at the mouth of the Rivière du Cap Rouge, in the suburban former town of Cap-Rouge (which merged into Quebec City in 2002).

Quebec was founded by Samuel de Champlain, a French explorer and diplomat, on 3 July 1608, and at the site of a long abandoned St. Lawrence Iroquoian settlement called Stadacona. Champlain, also called "The Father of New France", served as its administrator for the rest of his life.

The name "Canada" refers to this settlement. Although the Acadian settlement at Port-Royal was established three years earlier, Quebec came to be known as the cradle of North America's Francophone population. The place seemed favourable to the establishment of a permanent colony.

The population of the settlement remained small for decades. In 1629 it was captured by English privateers, led by David Kirke, during the Anglo-French War. Samuel de Champlain argued that the English seizing of the lands was illegal as the war had already ended, and worked to have the lands returned to France. As part of the ongoing negotiations of their exit from the Anglo-French War, in 1632 the English king Charles agreed to return the lands in exchange for Louis XIII paying his wife's dowry. These terms were signed into law with the Treaty of Saint-Germain-en-Laye. The lands in Quebec and Acadia were returned to the French Company of One Hundred Associates.

In 1665, there were 550 people in 70 houses living in the city. One-quarter of the people were members of religious orders: secular priests, Jesuits, Ursulines nuns and the order running the local hospital, Hotel-Dieu.

Quebec was the headquarters of many raids against New England during the four French and Indian Wars. In 1690 the city was attacked by the English, but was successfully defended. In the last of the conflicts, the French and Indian War (Seven Years' War), Quebec was captured by the British in 1759, and held until the end of the war in 1763. In that time many battles and sieges took place: the Battle of Beauport, a French victory (31 July 1759); the Battle of the Plains of Abraham, in which British troops under General James Wolfe defeated the French General Louis-Joseph de Montcalm on 13 September 1759, and shortly thereafter took the city after a short siege. A French counterattack saw a French victory at the Battle of Sainte-Foy (28 April 1760) but the subsequent second Siege of Quebec the following month however saw a final British victory.

France ceded New France, including the city, to Britain in 1763, when the French and Indian War officially ended.

At the end of French rule in 1763, forests, villages, fields and pastures surrounded the town of 8,000 inhabitants. The town distinguished itself by its monumental architecture, fortifications, and affluent homes of masonry and shacks in the suburbs of Saint-Jean and Saint-Roch. Despite its urbanity and its status as capital, Quebec City remained a small colonial city with close ties to its rural surroundings. Nearby inhabitants traded their farm surpluses and firewood for imported goods from France at the two city markets.

Modern history (1763–present)

During the American Revolution, revolutionary troops from the southern colonies assaulted the British garrison in an attempt to 'liberate' Quebec City, in a conflict now known as the Battle of Quebec (1775). The defeat of the revolutionaries from the south put an end to the hopes that the peoples of Quebec would rise and join the American Revolution so that Canada would join the Continental Congress and become part of the original United States of America along with the other British colonies of continental North America. In effect, the battle's outcome was the split of British North America into two distinct political entities.

The city itself was not attacked during the War of 1812, when the United States again attempted to annex Canadian lands. Amid fears of another American attack on Quebec City, construction of the Citadelle of Quebec began in 1820. The Americans did not attack Canada after the War of 1812, but the Citadelle continued to house a large British garrison until 1871. It is still in use by the military and is also a tourist attraction.

Until the late 18th century Québec was the most populous city in present-day Canada. As of the census of 1790, Montreal surpassed it with 18,000 inhabitants, but Quebec (pop. 14,000) remained the administrative capital of New France. It was then made the capital of Lower Canada by the Constitutional Act of 1791. From 1841 to 1867, the capital of the Province of Canada rotated between Kingston, Montreal, Toronto, Ottawa and Quebec City (from 1852 to 1856 and from 1859 to 1866).

Before the Royal Military College of Canada was established in 1876, the only French-speaking officer training school was the Quebec City School of Military Instruction, founded in 1864. The school was retained at Confederation, in 1867. In 1868, The School of Artillery was formed in Montreal.

The Quebec Conference on Canadian Confederation was held in the city in 1864. In 1867, Queen Victoria chose Ottawa as the definite capital of the Dominion of Canada, while Quebec City was confirmed as the capital of the newly created province of Quebec.

During World War II, two conferences were held in Quebec City. The First Quebec Conference was held in 1943 with Franklin D. Roosevelt (President of the United States), Winston Churchill (Prime Minister of the United Kingdom), William Lyon Mackenzie King (Prime Minister of Canada) and T. V. Soong (minister of foreign affairs of China). The Second Quebec Conference was held in 1944 and was attended by Churchill and Roosevelt. They took place in the buildings of the Citadelle and at the nearby Château Frontenac. A large part of the D-Day landing plans were made during those meetings.

Until 2002, Quebec was a mostly urbanized city and its territory coterminous with today's borough of La Cité-Limoilou. The Government of Quebec then mandated a municipal reorganization in the province, and many suburbs of the north shore of the Saint-Lawrence were merged into Quebec City, taking the form of boroughs. In 2008 the city celebrated its 400th anniversary and was gifted funds for festivities and construction projects by provincial and federal governments, as well as public artwork by various entities, including foreign countries.

Geography

Quebec City was built on the north bank of the Saint Lawrence River, where it narrows and meets the mouth of the Saint-Charles River. Old Quebec is located on top and at the foot of Cap-Diamant, which is on the eastern edge of a plateau called the promontory of Quebec (Quebec hill). Because of this topographic feature, the oldest and most urbanized borough of La Cité-Limoilou can be divided into upper and lower town. North of the hill, the Saint Lawrence Lowlands is flat and has rich, arable soil. Past this valley, the Laurentian Mountains lie to the north of the city but its foothills are within the municipal limits.

The Plains of Abraham are located on the southeastern extremity of the plateau, where high stone walls were integrated during colonial days.

The area was affected by the 1925 Charlevoix–Kamouraska earthquake.

The administrative region in which it is situated is officially referred to as Capitale-Nationale, and the term "national capital" is used to refer to Quebec City itself at the provincial level.

Climate

Quebec City is classified as a humid continental climate (Köppen climate classification Dfb).

Quebec City experiences four distinct seasons. Winters are cold, windy and snowy with average high temperatures  and lows . Spring and fall, although short, bring chilly to warm temperatures. Late heat waves as well as "Indian summers" are a common occurrence.

The city experiences around 1,916 hours of bright sunshine annually or 41.5% of possible sunshine, with summer being the sunniest, but also slightly the wettest season. During winter, snow generally stays on the ground from the end of November till mid-April.

Cityscape

Architecture

Much of the city's notable traditional architecture is located in Vieux-Québec (Old Quebec), within and below the fortifications. This area has a distinct European feel with its stone buildings and winding streets lined with shops and restaurants. Porte Saint-Louis and Porte Saint-Jean are the main gates through the walls from the modern section of downtown; the Kent Gate was a gift to the province from Queen Victoria and the foundation stone was laid by the Queen's daughter, Princess Louise, Marchioness of Lorne, on 11 June 1879. West of the walls are the Parliament Hill area, and to the south the Plains of Abraham.

The upper and lower town are linked by numerous stairs such as the Escalier « casse-cou » ("breakneck stairway") or the Old Quebec Funicular on the historic Rue du Petit-Champlain, where many small boutiques are found.  A small town square nearby, the Place Royale, now surrounded by picturesque stone buildings, is the site of Champlain's founding of the city in 1608.  On it is the Notre-Dame-des-Victoires church.  The Musée de la Civilisation is located nearby by the river.

Along with concrete high-rises such as Édifice Marie-Guyart and Le Concorde on parliament hill (see List of tallest buildings in Quebec City), the city's skyline is dominated by the massive Château Frontenac hotel, perched on top of Cap-Diamant. It was designed by architect Bruce Price, as one of a series of "château" style hotels built for the Canadian Pacific Railway company. The railway company sought to encourage luxury tourism and bring wealthy travellers to its trains.
Alongside the Château Frontenac is the Terrasse Dufferin, a walkway along the edge of the cliff, offering views of the Saint Lawrence River. The terrace leads toward the nearby Plains of Abraham, site of the battle in which the British took Quebec from France, and the Citadelle of Quebec, a Canadian Forces installation and the federal vice-regal secondary residence. The Parliament Building, the meeting place of the Parliament of Quebec, is also near the Citadelle.

Near the Château Frontenac is Notre-Dame de Québec Cathedral, mother church of the Roman Catholic Archdiocese of Quebec. It is the first church in the New World to be raised to a basilica and is the primatial church of Canada. There are 37 National Historic Sites of Canada in Quebec City and its enclaves.

Parks
One of the most notable is The Battlefields Park, which is home to 50 historical artillery pieces and the Plains of Abraham. The park offers views of the St. Lawrence River and has multiple historical structures and statues like the Joan of Arc on Horseback and a couple of Martello Towers. Historically this was the site of the Battle of the Plains of Abraham (1759), a decisive British victory in the Seven Years' War which ended French rule in what would become Canada, and the later Battle of Quebec (1775) during the American Revolutionary War, where the British were able to hold onto its last stronghold in the Northern extent of its North American territory.

Other large and centrally located parks are Parc Victoria, Parc Maizerets and Cartier-Brébeuf National Historic Site.
At Chauveau, activities such as canoeing, fishing and cross-country skiing are offered depending on the season, in addition to an interior soccer stadium. Among others, there is also the beach of Beauport Bay, as well as the Marais du Nord (north-end marsh land).

Quebec is the only large city in Canada along with Halifax lacking a public greenhouse. Nonetheless, outside areas known for their public gardens or landscaping include:
 The linear park named  that stretches  alongside the Saint Lawrence River, from Pierre Laporte Bridge to Sillery's east-end. Its bicycle and pedestrian paths then continues to Old Quebec and then along the Saint-Charles River. Just like the beach at Beauport Bay, the construction of the Promenade was funded by provincial and federal governments to celebrate the 400th anniversary of Quebec City in 2008.
 , slightly west of the Plains of Abraham in Sillery, and known for its natural landscaping as well as traditional gardens, such as those surrounding the historical . The historical significance of the park also lies in the former presence of the viceregal Government House of Quebec (1845–1966).
 The Domaine de Maizerets, where are found an arboretum and an observation tower, not far from the Saint Lawrence River and Beauport Bay.
  in Sillery.
 The  of Université Laval.

Boroughs and neighbourhoods

On 1 January 2002, the 12 former towns of Sainte-Foy, Beauport, Charlesbourg, Sillery, Loretteville, Val-Bélair, Cap-Rouge, Saint-Émile, Vanier, L'Ancienne-Lorette, Saint-Augustin-de-Desmaures and Lac-Saint-Charles were annexed by Quebec City. This was one of several municipal mergers which took place across Quebec on that date. Following a demerger referendum, L'Ancienne-Lorette and Saint-Augustin-de-Desmaures were reconstituted as separate municipalities on 1 January 2006, but the other former municipalities remain part of Quebec City. On 1 November 2009, Quebec City re-organized its boroughs, reducing the number from 8 to 6.

Quebec City's six boroughs are further divided into 35 neighbourhoods. In most cases, the name of the latter remained the same as the historical town or parish municipality it replaced. Neighbourhoods each elect their own council, whose powers rest in public consultations.

Compared to many other cities in North America, there is less variation between average household incomes between the neighbourhoods. However, some disparities exist. The southwest former cities of Sillery, Cap-Rouge and Sainte-Foy are considered to be the wealthiest, along with some parts of Montcalm and Old Quebec.

The city's traditional working-class areas are found in the lower town below Old Quebec (Saint-Sauveur and Saint-Roch) and directly across the Saint-Charles River to the north (Vanier and Limoilou). However, parts of Limoilou, Saint-Sauveur and particularly Saint-Roch have seen gentrification in the last 20 years, attracting young professionals and the construction of new offices and condos.

Northern sections (Loretteville, Val-Bélair) and eastern sections (Beauport, Charlesbourg) are mostly a mix of middle-class residential suburbs with industrial pockets.

Demographics 

According to Statistics Canada, there were 800,296 people residing in the Quebec City census metropolitan area.

In 2016, 20.6% of the resident population in Quebec City was of retirement age (65 and over for males and females) compared with 16.9% in Canada. The median age is 43.3 years of age compared to 41.2 years of age for Canada as a whole. In the five years between 2011 and 2016, the population of Quebec City grew by 3%.

Ethnicity 
In 2021, 9.4% of Quebec City residents reported visible minority status, a relatively low figure for a large Canadian city but in line with Quebec visible minority trends. Montreal, the second largest city in Canada, has a lower percentage of visible minorities than Calgary and Edmonton; the national average was 26.5%. The largest visible minority group were Black Canadians, who formed 4.1% of the population. Quebec City also has a lower percentage of Indigenous Canadians (1.8%) than the national average of 5.0%.

Note: Totals greater than 100% due to multiple origin responses.

Immigration 
The 2021 census reported that immigrants (individuals born outside Canada) comprise 45,230 persons or 8.5% of the total population of Quebec City. Of the total immigrant population, the top countries of origin were France (7,360 persons or 16.3%), Colombia (2,865 persons or 6.3%), Morocco (2,715 persons or 6.0%), Ivory Coast (2,500 persons or 5.5%), Cameroon (2,225 persons or 4.9%), Algeria (1,920 persons or 4.2%), Tunisia (1,795 persons or 4.0%), Democratic Republic of the Congo (1,315 persons or 1,315%), Haiti (1,120 persons or 2.5%), and Brazil (1,115 persons or 2.5%).

Language 
The great majority of city residents are native French speakers. The English-speaking community peaked in relative terms during the 1860s, when 40% of Quebec City's residents were Anglophone. Today, native Anglophones make up only 1.5% of the population of both the city and its metropolitan area. However, the summer tourist season and the Quebec Winter Carnival attract significant numbers of Anglophone (as well as Francophone) visitors, and English can often be heard in areas frequented by tourists.

According to Statistics Canada, 94.6% of Quebec City's population spoke French as their mother tongue. In addition, more than a third of city residents reported speaking both French and English.

Religion 
According to the 2021 census, religious groups in Quebec City included:
Christianity (349,320 persons or 65.5%)
Irreligion (162,900 persons or 30.5%)
Islam (17,490 persons or 3.3%)
Buddhism (1,565 persons or 0.3%)
Hinduism (515 persons or 0.1%)
Judaism (305 persons or 0.1%)
Indigenous Spirituality (75 persons or <0.1%)
Sikhism (20 persons or <0.1%)
Other (1,355 persons or 0.3%)

Economy

Most jobs in Quebec City are concentrated in public administration, defence, services, commerce, transport and tourism. As the provincial capital, the city benefits from being a regional administrative and services centre: apropos, the provincial government is the largest employer in the city, employing 27,900 people as of 2007. CHUQ (the local hospital network) is the city's largest institutional employer, with more than 10,000 employees in 2007. The unemployment rate in June 2018 was 3.8%, below the national average (6.0%) and the second-lowest of Canada's 34 largest cities, behind Peterborough (2.7%).

Around 10% of jobs are in manufacturing. Principal products include pulp and paper, processed food, metal/wood items, chemicals, electronics and electrical equipment, and printed materials. The city hosts the headquarters of a variety of prominent companies, including: fashion retailer La Maison Simons, engineering firms BPR and Norda Stelo; Cominar real estate investment trust; Industrial Alliance, La Capitale, Promutuel, SSQ Financial Group, and Union Canadienne in the insurance sector; Beenox, Gearbox Software, Frima Studio, Sarbakan and Ubisoft in the computer games industry; AeternaZentaris and DiagnoCure in pharmaceuticals; Amalgame, Cossette and Vision 7 in marketing and advertising; Institut National d'Optique (INO), EXFO, OptoSecurity in technology. It is also the domicile of the sole manufactory of the cigarette maker Rothmans, Benson & Hedges.

Business districts 

While the traditional central business districts and their large office buildings are found on Parliament Hill (especially for provincial administration) and just below in Saint-Roch (nowadays notable for IT and the video game industry), a newer one has emerged in the  area of Sainte-Foy, where a number of accounting and law firms have moved since the 2000s. Other suburban places identified by the city for their potential are the Lebourgneuf area for private offices, as well as Estimauville Street where the Government of Canada already has many civil servants and where several city officials are expected to move in the 2020s.

Culture

Quebec City is known for its Winter Carnival, its summer music festival and its Saint-Jean-Baptiste Day celebrations.
The Jardin zoologique du Québec, now closed, reopened in 2002 after extensive repairs before ultimately shutting permanently in 2006. It featured 750 specimens of 300 different species of animals. The zoo specialized in winged fauna and garden themes but also featured several species of mammals. While it emphasized Quebec's indigenous fauna, one of its main attractions was the Indo-Australian greenhouse, which initially cost $14 million to build. It featured fauna and flora from regions surrounding the Indian Ocean.

Parc Aquarium du Québec, which reopened in 2002 on a site overlooking the Saint Lawrence River, features more than 10,000 specimens of mammals, reptiles, fish and other aquatic fauna of North America and the Arctic. Polar bears and various species of seals of the Arctic sector and the "Large Ocean", a large basin offering visitors a view from underneath, make up part of the aquarium's main attractions.

Québec City has a number of historic sites, art galleries and museums, including Citadelle of Quebec, Musée national des beaux-arts du Québec, Ursulines of Quebec, and Musée de la civilisation.

Other tourist attractions include Montmorency Falls, and, just outside the city limits, the Basilica of Sainte-Anne-de-Beaupré, the Mont-Sainte-Anne ski resort, and the Ice Hotel.

Sports
Quebec City has hosted a number of recent sporting events, as well as being shortlisted for the 2002 Winter Olympics city selection. The Special Olympics Canada National Winter Games was held in the city from 26 February to 1 March 2008. Quebec City co-hosted with Halifax, Nova Scotia, the 2008 IIHF World Championship. Regular sporting events held in the city include the Coupe Banque Nationale, a Women's Tennis Association tournament; Crashed Ice, an extreme downhill skating race; Quebec International Pee-Wee Hockey Tournament, a minor hockey tournament; and the Tour de Québec International cycling stage race. In December 2011, Quebec City hosted the ISU Grand Prix of Figure Skating Final at the Pavillon de la Jeunesse at ExpoCité.

The city currently has one professional team, the baseball team Capitales de Québec, which plays in the Frontier League in downtown's Stade Canac. The team was established in 1999 and originally played in the Northern League. It has seven league titles, won in 2006, 2009, 2010, 2011, 2012, 2013 and 2017. A professional basketball team, the Quebec Kebs, played in National Basketball League of Canada in 2011 but folded before the 2012 season, and a semi-professional soccer team, the Dynamo de Québec, played in the Première ligue de soccer du Québec, until 2019.

The city had a professional ice hockey team, the Quebec Nordiques, which played in the World Hockey Association (WHA) from 1972 to 1979 and the National Hockey League (NHL) from 1979 to 1995, maintaining a strong rivalry with the Montreal Canadiens. Due to a disadvantageous exchange rate with respect to the US dollar, the team moved to Denver, Colorado, in 1995, becoming the Colorado Avalanche. A lower-tier team, the Quebec Rafales, played in the professional International Hockey League from 1996 to 1998.

The Videotron Centre was built with the hope of getting an NHL franchise (relocation or expansion) in Quebec City. The project was funded regardless of whether an NHL team arrives. It is also hoped that the arena can help Quebec City win a future Winter Olympics games bid. It has now replaced the Colisée de Québec as the main multifunctional arena in Quebec City.

Other teams include the Quebec Remparts in major junior hockey (QMJHL), Université Laval varsity team Rouge & Or, the Quebec City Monarks, and Quebec City Rebelles of La Ligue de Football de Québec; the Alouettes de Charlesbourg of the Ligue de Baseball Junior Élite du Québec; the women's hockey team Quebec Phoenix of the Canadian Women's Hockey League; and soccer club Quebec Arsenal of the W-League.

Quebec City holds the Coop FIS Cross-Country World Cup. This is a ski event that welcomes the best of that sport.

Politics

Since the 1970s, centre-right parties such as Union Nationale, Crédit social, Conservative Party of Canada (CPC), Action démocratique du Québec and Coalition Avenir Québec (CAQ) have been more popular in the Quebec City region than elsewhere in the province. After the federal election of 2006, six of the ten conservative ridings of the province were found in its metropolitan area (where the CPC garnered 39% of the vote, against 25% at the provincial scale) and in the city proper, the CPC won three of the four seats that existed at that time (the riding of Quebec went to the Bloc). Along with the city's lesser support for Quebec sovereignty, this led political pundits to speculate about a "Quebec City mystery".

Various lines of thought were offered, including the popularity of the talk radio stations CHOI and FM93 expressing fiscally conservative and non-politically correct opinions. Over the years, this genre has been qualified by its detractors as radio poubelle (fr) ("trash radio") and hosts like Jeff Fillion and André Arthur likened to shock jocks. Also, compared to the rest of the province, people of the area may favour harsher criminal sentences, and lower-class households may share political views more in line with those earning more. The reasons for this remain unclear. Another researcher put forward the historical factors that led to Montreal surpassing Quebec as the metropolis of British North America in the early 19th century. According to this theory, its permanent status of "second city" (albeit the capital) engendered feelings of "repressed jealousy".

The "mystery" was relativized following the 2011 federal election. All five ridings within the city were won by the leftist New Democratic Party, in the so-called "orange wave" that temporarily swept the province. Nonetheless, five of the six seats won by the Conservatives in the province were found in the greater Quebec City area. At the 2018 provincial election, the leftist party Québec solidaire managed to win two districts, Taschereau and Jean-Lesage, the most densely populated in town, but the centre-right CAQ, as it swept the province, won six of the nine districts encompassing the city, and 15 of the 18 in the administrative regions of Capitale-Nationale and Chaudière-Appalaches (south shore of the city).

Municipal government

Quebec City is governed by a mayor–council government, which includes the 21 single-member districts of the legislative Quebec City Council and the separately elected mayor. The councilors are elected by first-past-the-post voting while the mayor is elected by the city at-large. Both usually belong to political parties and are elected at the same time every 4 years. The mayor is an ex officio member of the council but is not its president and has no vote. The current one is Bruno Marchand, elected in 2021.

Each of the city's six boroughs has a council composed of 3 to 5 of the aforementioned councillors, depending on the size of its population. It has jurisdiction with matters such as local road maintenance, leisure, waste collection, and small grants for community projects and others, but cannot tax or borrow money. The boroughs are further divided into 35 neighbourhoods, which also have councils devoted to public consultations, each led by 11 citizens. Their geographical limits may be distinct from those of the city's 21 electoral districts, and councillors also sit at their neighbourhood councils as non-voting ex officio members.

Public safety
The city is protected by Service de police de la Ville de Québec and Service de protection contre les incendies de Québec (fire dept.) The census metropolitan area (CMA) of Quebec City has one of the lowest crime rates in Canada, with 3,193 per 100,000 persons in 2017, only behind Toronto's CMA (3,115). Exceptionally, no homicide (defined as a criminal death, deliberate or not) was reported in 2007. Still, eight homicides occurred the following year.

On 29 January 2017, a university student shot and killed six people with another 17 injured in a mass shooting at the Quebec Islamic Cultural Centre. Even after accounting for this event, the CMA of Quebec had the second lowest Crime Severity Index in the country in 2017, at 48.5, after that of Barrie (45.3). For the year 2017, the number of reported incidents investigated as hate crimes by the city police increased from 57 to 71, and for those specifically targeting Muslims from 21 to 42. The overall rate of reported hate crimes was thus 7.1 per 100,000 population — higher than the national average (3.9) and in Montreal (4.7) but lower than rates in Hamilton, Ottawa and Thunder Bay.

There were two first-degree murders in 2018, seven in 2017 (six of which were due to the mosque shooting), one in 2016, two in 2015 and three in 2014.

On 1 November 2020, the Quebec City police arrested a man dressed in medieval costume and armed with a Japanese sword. Carl Girouard, the arrestee, reportedly killed 2 people and hospitalized 5 others.

Education

The Université Laval (Laval University) is in the southwestern part of the city, in the borough of Sainte-Foy, except for its school of architecture, which is at the "Vieux-Séminaire" building in Old Quebec.

The Université du Québec system administrative headquarters and some of its specialized schools (École nationale d'administration publique, Institut national de la recherche scientifique and Télé-université) are in the Saint-Roch neighbourhood.

CEGEPs of Quebec city are Collège François-Xavier-Garneau, Cégep Limoilou, Cégep de Sainte-Foy and Champlain College St. Lawrence, as well as private and specialized post-secondary institutions such as Campus Notre-Dame-de-Foy, Collège Mérici, Collège Bart, Collège CDI, Collège O'Sullivan and Collège Multihexa.

Three school boards, including Commission scolaire de la Capitale, operate secular francophone schools, and Central Quebec School Board operates the few existing anglophone ones. Until 1998 Commission des écoles catholiques de Québec operated public Catholic schools of all languages.

Quebec City has the oldest educational institution for women in North America, led by the Ursulines of Quebec, which is now a private elementary school.

Infrastructure

Transportation

Roads
Two bridges (the Quebec Bridge and Pierre Laporte Bridge) and a ferry service connect the city with Lévis and its suburbs along the south shore of the Saint Lawrence River. The Orleans Island Bridge links Quebec City with pastoral Orleans Island.

Quebec City is an important hub in the province's autoroute system, as well as boasting one of the highest "expressway lane kilometres per 1000 persons" in the country (1.10 km), behind Calgary (1.74), Hamilton (1.61) and Edmonton (1.24). Autoroute 40 connects the region with Montreal and Ottawa to the west and Sainte-Anne-de-Beaupré and the Charlevoix region to the east. Autoroute 20 parallels the south shore of the St. Lawrence River, linking Quebec City with Montreal and Toronto to the west and Rivière-du-Loup, Rimouski, and the Maritime Provinces to the east. Autoroute 73 provides a north–south link through the metropolitan area, linking it with Saint-Georges, the Beauce region, and Maine to the south and Saguenay and the Lac-Saint-Jean region to the north.

Within the metropolitan region, Autoroutes 40, 73, and several spur routes link the city centre with its suburbs.

Autoroute 573 (Autoroute Henri-IV) connects the city with CFB Valcartier. Autoroute 740 (Autoroute Robert-Bourassa) serves as a north–south inner belt. Autoroute 440 comprises two separate autoroutes to the west and east of the urban core. Originally meant to be connected by a tunnel under the city centre, the two sections are separated by a  gap. There are no current plans to connect them. The western section (Autoroute Charest) connects Autoroutes 40 and 73 with Boulevard Charest (a main east–west avenue) while the eastern section (Autoroute Dufferin-Montmorency) links the city centre with Beauport and Montmorency Falls.

Public transport

The Réseau de transport de la Capitale (RTC) is responsible for public transport in the region. The RTC operates a fleet of buses and has recently implemented articulated buses. The RTC is studying the return of a tramway system to help ease overcrowding on its busiest lines as well as attract new users to public transit. The two billion dollar revitalization project needs approval from higher levels of government since the city does not have the financial resources to fund such an ambitious project on its own.

Rail transport is operated by Via Rail at the Gare du Palais ('Palace Station'). The station is the eastern terminus of the railway's main Quebec City-Windsor Corridor. An inter-city bus station, with connections to the provincial long-distance bus network, is adjacent to the train station, and is used by operators such as Orleans Express and Intercar.

Air and sea

The Port of Quebec is a seaport on the St. Lawrence with facilities in the first, fifth and sixth boroughs.

Notable people

Partner cities
Quebec City is twinned with:
 Bordeaux, France
 Calgary, Alberta.

It has formal agreements with other cities although they are not active anymore as of 2012. These include Saint Petersburg, Guanajuato City, Huế, Paris, Xi'an and Liège and Namur in francophone Belgium.
These were the ex Mayor Régis Labeaume's priorities. However, the new mayor Bruno Marchand wants to renew exchanges with the other cities.

See also

 List of regional county municipalities and equivalent territories in Quebec

Notes

References

External links 

 
 Official website of Québec City Tourism
 Focus on Geography Series, 2016 Census — Census subdivision of Québec City from Statistics Canada
 CBC Digital Archives — CBC Television Special: Preserving Quebec City (1976)
 CBC Digital Archives — Quebec City: 400 Years of History

 
Cities and towns in Quebec
World Heritage Sites in Canada
Quebec populated places on the Saint Lawrence River
Populated places established in 1608
1608 establishments in New France
Former colonial capitals in Canada
Hudson's Bay Company trading posts
Port settlements in Quebec
1608 in North America
1608 in Canada